Their Variables is an EP by Joy Electric. It was released in conjunction with the full-length The Otherly Opus. It contains remixes of all ten songs from that album, plus two new songs.

Track listing
(all songs written by Ronnie Martin)
"The Otherly Opus" (remixed by Solvent) – 3:55
"Frivolity and its Necessities" (remixed by Celluloide) – 3:16
"Colours in Dutch" (remixed by Norway) – 3:13
"The Ushering in of the Magical Era" (remixed by The Viirus)– 3:52
"Write Your Last Paragraph" (remixed by B! Machine) – 4:34
"The Memory of Alpha" (remixed by Travelogue) – 3:31
"Red Will Dye these Snows of Silver" (remixed by The Echoing Green) – 3:34
"The Timbre of the Timber Colony" (remixed by Flashlight Party) – 2:44
"Ponderance Need Not Know" (remixed by Engine Beach) – 5:16
"A Glass to Count All the Hours" (remixed by Scholastics) – 6:33
"Like Fools, they Bathed in the Pools" – 5:10
"The Warmth of Wooden Lanterns" – 4:00

Credits
Ronnie Martin – synthesizer, vocals
Mandi Spayd – sleeve design

EEP Society albums
2007 EPs
Joy Electric EPs